Down Incognito is a song by Winger, released as a single in 1993, from their album Pull. Released in 1993, it reached #15 on the Mainstream rock Billboard charts.

Critical reception
Larry Flick from Billboard considered that "seamless harmonies during the chorus, Kip Winger's increasingly warm delivery, and slick synth fills add up to a track that is a good fit for pop and album rock formats".

Charts

References

Winger (band) songs
1993 singles
Songs written by Kip Winger
1993 songs
Atlantic Records singles
Songs written by Reb Beach